The 2010 Banka Koper Slovenia Open was a women's tennis tournament played on outdoor hard courts. It was the 5th edition of the Banka Koper Slovenia Open, and was part of the WTA International tournaments of the 2010 WTA Tour. It took place in Portorož, Slovenia, from July 19 through July 25, 2010. Anna Chakvetadze won the singles title.

Champions

Singles

 Anna Chakvetadze defeated  Johanna Larsson, 6–1, 6–2
It was Chakvetadze's first title of the year and 8th of her career.

Doubles

 Maria Kondratieva /  Vladimíra Uhlířová defeated  Anna Chakvetadze /  Marina Erakovic, 6–4, 2–6, [10–7]

Entrants

Seeds

Seedings are based on the rankings of July 12, 2010.

Other entrants
The following players received wildcards into the singles main draw
  Andreja Klepač
  Tamira Paszek
  Katarina Srebotnik

The following players received entry from the qualifying draw:
  Elena Bovina
  Alexandra Panova
  Anna Tatishvili
  Anastasiya Yakimova

External links
Official website

Banka Koper Slovenia Open
Banka Koper Slovenia Open
2010 in Slovenian tennis